Jean Baptiste de Caux of Blacquetot (24 May 1723, Montreuil, Pas-de-Calais - 8 September 1796) was a French general.

He was  appointed Marechal de Camp on 1 March 1780, and Lieutenant General on 20 May 1791.

His son was Louis Victor de Blacquetot de Caux.

References

1723 births
1796 deaths
People from Montreuil, Pas-de-Calais
French generals